The following elections occurred in the year 1998.

Africa
 1998 Burkinabé presidential election
 1998 Central African parliamentary election
 1998 Gabonese presidential election
 1998 Guinean presidential election
 1998 Lesotho general election
 1998 Nigerian parliamentary election
 1998 Senegalese parliamentary election
 1998 Seychellois general election
 1998 Swazi general election
 1998 São Toméan legislative election
 1998 Togolese presidential election

Asia
 1998 Hong Kong legislative election
 1998 Indian general election
 1998 Indonesian presidential election
 1998 Kyrgyz constitutional referendum
 1998 North Korean parliamentary election
 1998 Philippine House of Representatives elections
 1998 Philippine Senate election
 1998 Philippine general election
 1998 Philippine presidential election
 1998 Republic of China legislative election
 1998 Sri Lankan local government elections

India
 1998 Indian general election
 Indian general election in Andhra Pradesh, 1998
 Indian general election in Haryana, 1998
 Indian general election in National Capital Territory of Delhi, 1998
 Indian general election in Tamil Nadu, 1998
 State Assembly elections in India, 1998

Japan
 1998 Japanese House of Councillors election

Australia
 1998 Australian Capital Territory general election
 1998 Australian federal election
 1998 Mulgrave state by-election
 1998 Northern Territory referendum
 1998 Queensland state election
 1998 Tasmanian state election

Europe
 1998 Armenian presidential election
 1998 Basque regional election
 1998 Cypriot presidential election
 1998 Czech legislative election
 1998 Danish parliamentary election
 1998 Dutch general election
 1998 Faroese general election
 1998 Hungarian parliamentary election
 1998 Irish constitutional referendums
 1998 Latvian parliamentary election
 1997–1998 Lithuanian presidential election
 1998 Macedonian parliamentary election
 1998 Maltese general election
 1998 Montenegrin local elections
 1998 Montenegrin parliamentary election
 1998 Portuguese abortion referendum
 1998 Portuguese regionalisation referendum
 1998 Slovak parliamentary election
 1998 Stockholm municipal election
 1998 Swedish general election
 1998 Ukrainian parliamentary election

Austria
 1998 Austrian presidential election

France
 1998 Alsace regional election
 1998 Brittany regional election
 1998 French cantonal elections
 1998 French regional elections
 1998 Rhône-Alpes regional election

Germany
 1998 Bavarian state election
 1998 German federal election
 1998 Lower Saxony state election

Moldova
 1998 Moldovan parliamentary election

United Kingdom
 1998 United Kingdom local elections
 1998 Northern Ireland Assembly election
 1998 Northern Ireland Good Friday Agreement referendum

United Kingdom local
 1998 United Kingdom local elections

English local
 1998 Adur Council election
 1998 Amber Valley Council election
 1998 Barking and Dagenham Council election
 1998 Barnet Council election
 1998 Barnsley Council election
 1998 Barrow-in-Furness Council election
 1998 Bedford Council election
 1998 Bexley Council election
 1998 Birmingham City Council election
 1998 Bradford Council election
 1998 Brent Council election
 1998 Brentwood Council election
 1998 Bromley Council election
 1998 Burnley Council election
 1998 Bury Council election
 1998 Calderdale Council election
 1998 Camden Council election
 1998 Cheltenham Council election
 1998 Cherwell Council election
 1998 Chorley Council election
 1998 Coventry Council election
 1998 Craven Council election
 1998 Croydon Council election
 1998 Daventry Council election
 1998 Derby Council election
 1998 Doncaster Council election
 1998 Dudley Council election
 1998 Eastleigh Council election
 1998 Ellesmere Port and Neston Council election
 1998 Enfield Council election
 1998 Epping Forest Council election
 1998 Fareham Council election
 1998 Gateshead Council election
 1998 Gosport Council election
 1998 Greenwich Council election
 1998 Harlow Council election
 1998 Hart Council election
 1998 Hartlepool Council election
 1998 Hastings Council election
 1998 Hounslow Council election
 1998 Hull Council election
 1998 Hyndburn Council election
 1998 Ipswich Borough Council election
 1998 Kingston upon Thames Council election
 1998 Kirklees Council election
 1998 Knowsley Council election
 1998 Lambeth Council election
 1998 Leeds Council election
 1998 Lewisham Council election
 1998 City of Lincoln Council election
 1998 Liverpool Council election
 1998 Manchester Council election
 1998 Merton Council election
 1998 Mole Valley Council election
 1998 Newcastle City Council election
 1998 Newcastle-under-Lyme Council election
 1998 Newham Council election
 1998 North Tyneside Council election
 1998 Oldham Council election
 1998 Oxford City Council election
 1998 Penwith Council election
 1998 Portsmouth Council election
 1998 Preston Council election
 1998 Purbeck Council election
 1998 Redditch Council election
 1998 Reigate and Banstead Council election
 1998 Richmond upon Thames Council election
 1998 Rochdale Council election
 1998 Rochford Council election
 1998 Rossendale Council election
 1998 Rotherham Council election
 1998 Rugby Council election
 1998 Runnymede Council election
 1998 Rushmoor Council election
 1998 Salford Council election
 1998 Sandwell Council election
 1998 Sefton Council election
 1998 Sheffield Council election
 1998 Solihull Council election
 1998 South Lakeland Council election
 1998 South Tyneside Council election
 1998 Southampton Council election
 1998 Southwark Council election
 1998 St Albans City and District Council election
 1998 St Helens Council election
 1998 Stevenage Council election
 1998 Stockport Council election
 1998 Stratford-on-Avon Council election
 1998 Sunderland Council election
 1998 Swindon Council election
 1998 Tameside Council election
 1998 Tamworth Council election
 1998 Tandridge Council election
 1998 Three Rivers Council election
 1998 Tower Hamlets Council election
 1998 Trafford Council election
 1998 Tunbridge Wells Council election
 1998 Wakefield Council election
 1998 Walsall Council election
 1998 Waltham Forest Council election
 1998 Wandsworth Council election
 1998 Watford Council election
 1998 Waveney Council election
 1998 Welwyn Hatfield Council election
 1998 West Lancashire Council election
 1998 West Lindsey Council election
 1998 Weymouth and Portland Council election
 1998 Wigan Council election
 1998 Winchester Council election
 1998 Wirral Council election
 1998 Woking Council election
 1998 Wolverhampton Council election
 1998 Worcester Council election
 1998 Worthing Council election
 1998 Wyre Forest Council election

Japan
 1998 Japanese House of Councillors election

North America
 1998 Belizean general election

Canada
 1998 Alberta Senate nominee election
 1998 Edmonton municipal election
 1998 Manitoba municipal elections
 1998 Montreal municipal election
 1998 Nova Scotia general election
 1998 Quebec general election
 1998 Quebec municipal elections
 1998 Winnipeg municipal election

United States
 1998 United States Senate elections
 1998 United States elections
 1998 United States gubernatorial elections
 Vote-by-mail in Oregon

United States gubernatorial
 1998 Alabama gubernatorial election
 1998 Alaska gubernatorial election
 1998 Arizona gubernatorial election
 1998 California gubernatorial election
 1998 Colorado gubernatorial election
 1998 Connecticut gubernatorial election
 1998 Idaho gubernatorial election
 1998 Illinois gubernatorial election
 1998 Maine gubernatorial election
 1998 Michigan gubernatorial election
 1998 New Mexico gubernatorial election
 1998 New York gubernatorial election
 1998 Oregon gubernatorial election
 1998 Pennsylvania gubernatorial election
 1998 United States gubernatorial elections

United States mayoral
 1998 New Orleans mayoral election
 1998 Washington, D.C. mayoral election

Alabama
 1998 Alabama gubernatorial election
 United States Senate election in Alabama, 1998

Alaska
 1998 Alaska gubernatorial election
 United States Senate election in Alaska, 1998

Arizona
 1998 Arizona gubernatorial election
 United States Senate election in Arizona, 1998

California
 1998 California State Assembly election
 1998 California Attorney General election
 1998 California Insurance Commissioner election
 1998 California Secretary of State election
 1998 California State Controller election
 1998 California elections
 1998 California State Treasurer election
 1998 California Superintendent of Public Instruction election
 1998 California gubernatorial election
 1998 California lieutenant gubernatorial election
 1998 California Courts of Appeal election
 1998 San Francisco Board of Supervisors election
 1998 California State Senate election

California congressional
 1998 United States Senate election in California
 1998 United States House of Representatives elections in California

Colorado
 1998 Colorado gubernatorial election
 United States Senate election in Colorado, 1998

Georgia (U.S. state)
 1998 Georgia gubernatorial election
 United States House of Representatives elections in Georgia, 1998

Hawaii
 1998 Hawaii gubernatorial election
 United States Senate election in Hawaii, 1998

Idaho
 1998 Idaho gubernatorial election
 United States Senate election in Idaho, 1998

Illinois
 1998 Illinois gubernatorial election
 United States Senate election in Illinois, 1998

Iowa
 1998 Iowa gubernatorial election
 United States Senate election in Iowa, 1998

Kansas
 1998 Kansas gubernatorial election
 United States Senate election in Kansas, 1998

Louisiana
 1998 New Orleans mayoral election
 United States Senate election in Louisiana, 1998

Maine
 1998 Maine gubernatorial election

Maryland
 United States Senate election in Maryland, 1998

Massachusetts
 1998 Massachusetts general election
 1998 Massachusetts gubernatorial election

Michigan
 1998 Michigan gubernatorial election

Minnesota
 1998 Minnesota gubernatorial election

New Hampshire
 United States Senate election in New Hampshire, 1998

New Mexico
 1998 New Mexico gubernatorial election

North Carolina
 1998 North Carolina judicial election
 1998 United States House of Representatives elections in North Carolina
 1998 United States Senate election in North Carolina

North Dakota
 United States Senate election in North Dakota, 1998

Ohio
 1998 Ohio gubernatorial election
 United States Senate election in Ohio, 1998

Oklahoma
 1998 Oklahoma state elections
 1998 Oklahoma gubernatorial election
 United States Senate election in Oklahoma, 1998

Oregon
 Oregon Ballot Measure 58 (1998)
 1998 Oregon gubernatorial election
 United States Senate election in Oregon, 1998

Pennsylvania
 1998 Pennsylvania gubernatorial election
 United States Senate election in Pennsylvania, 1998

Rhode Island
 1998 Rhode Island gubernatorial election

South Carolina
 1998 South Carolina gubernatorial election
 United States House of Representatives elections in South Carolina, 1998

South Dakota
 United States Senate election in South Dakota, 1998

Texas
 1998 Texas gubernatorial election

United States House of Representatives
 United States House of Representatives elections in Georgia, 1998
 United States House of Representatives elections in North Carolina, 1998
 United States House of Representatives elections in South Carolina, 1998
 United States House of Representatives elections in California, 1998
 1998 United States House of Representatives elections

United States Senate
 1998 United States Senate elections
 United States Senate election in Alabama, 1998
 United States Senate election in Alaska, 1998
 United States Senate election in Arizona, 1998
 United States Senate election in Arkansas, 1998
 United States Senate election in California, 1998
 United States Senate election in Colorado, 1998
 United States Senate election in Connecticut, 1998
 United States Senate election in Florida, 1998
 United States Senate election in Georgia, 1998
 United States Senate election in Idaho, 1998
 United States Senate election in Indiana, 1998
 United States Senate election in Iowa, 1998
 United States Senate election in Kansas, 1998
 United States Senate election in Kentucky, 1998
 United States Senate election in Louisiana, 1998
 United States Senate election in Maryland, 1998
 1998 United States Senate election in Missouri
 United States Senate election in Nevada, 1998
 United States Senate election in New Hampshire, 1998
 United States Senate election in New York, 1998
 United States Senate election in North Carolina, 1998
 United States Senate election in North Dakota, 1998
 United States Senate election in Ohio, 1998
 United States Senate election in Oklahoma, 1998
 United States Senate election in Oregon, 1998
 United States Senate election in Pennsylvania, 1998
 United States Senate election in South Carolina, 1998
 United States Senate election in South Dakota, 1998
 United States Senate election in Illinois, 1998
 United States Senate election in Utah, 1998
 United States Senate election in Vermont, 1998
 United States Senate election in Washington, 1998
 United States Senate election in Wisconsin, 1998

Washington (U.S. state)
 United States Senate election in Washington, 1998

Washington, D.C.
 1998 Washington, D.C. mayoral election

Oceania
 1998 Taranaki-King Country by-election
 1998 Vanuatuan general election

Australia
 1998 Australian Capital Territory general election
 1998 Australian federal election
 1998 Mulgrave state by-election
 1998 Northern Territory referendum
 1998 Queensland state election
 1998 Tasmanian state election

Hawaii
 1998 Hawaii gubernatorial election
 United States Senate election in Hawaii, 1998

New Zealand
 1998 Taranaki-King Country by-election

South America
 1998 Brazilian general election
 1998 Colombian presidential election
 1998 Ecuadorian general election
 1998 Venezuelan presidential election
 1998 Paraguayan general election

See also

 
1998
Elections